Sherfield Park, also known as Taylor's Farm, is a civil parish in the Basingstoke and Deane district of Hampshire, England.

The civil parish covers a housing estate that was built between 2004 and 2014 and now has 1,000 dwellings. The greenfield site had until then mainly been part of Taylor's Farm, a name which has sometimes been used for the estate. The estate was originally part of the parish of Sherfield on Loddon. Between 2008 and 2016, the area was a ward of this parish which was named Taylor's Farm. On 1 April 2016, Sherfield Park was separated to form a parish of its own, with its first parish council being elected a month later. Sherfield Park is in the borough electoral ward of Chineham and the county council division of Loddon.

References

External links

 Parish Council website
 Community Centre website

Civil parishes in Basingstoke and Deane